The Atlantic Coast Conference first sponsored football in 1953. This is a list of its annual standings since establishment.

Standings

References

Atlantic Coast Conference
Standings